Christophe Rochus was the winner in 2008, but he didn't play this year.
Marcos Daniel became the new champion. He defeated Olivier Rochus in the final of tournament.

Seeds

Draw

Finals

Top half

Bottom half

External Links
 Main Draw
 Qualifying Draw

Zagreb Open - Singles
Zagreb Open